The  are a collection of Buddhist temples in western Aichi Prefecture, Japan, all dedicated to the bodhisattva Avalokitesvara (Kannon). The name is derived from Owari Province, the former name for the area. The list was created in 1955.

Thirty-three Kannon

Tōkai Hundred Kannon
The Owari Thirty-three Kannon combine with the Mino Thirty-three Kannon in Gifu Prefecture, the Mikawa Thirty-three Kannon in eastern Aichi Prefecture and Toyokawa Inari to form the Tōkai Hundred Kannon.

See also 
Tōkai Hundred Kannon
Mino Thirty-three Kannon
Toyokawa Inari
 Glossary of Japanese Buddhism (for an explanation of terms concerning Japanese Buddhism)

External links
Owari Thirty-three Kannon

References

Buddhist temples in Aichi Prefecture